Aspergillus ambiguus is a species of fungus in the genus Aspergillus. It is from the Terrei section. The species was first described in 1955. It has been reported to produce a butyrolactone and terrequinone A.

Growth and morphology

A. ambiguus has been cultivated on both Czapek yeast extract agar (CYA) plates and Malt Extract Agar Oxoid® (MEAOX) plates. The growth morphology of the colonies can be seen in the pictures below.

References 

ambiguus
Fungi described in 1955